NA-98 Faisalabad-IV is a constituency for the National Assembly of Pakistan comprising mainly Sammundri Tehsil from the former NA-79 and the town of Mamu Kanjan in Tandlian Wala Tehsil from the former NA-78. The remaining part of Tandlian Wala Tehsil, which was previously in NA-78, is now in NA-103.

Members of Parliament

Since 2018: NA-104 Faisalabad-IV

Election 2002 

General elections were held on 10 Oct 2002. Rajab Ali Khan Baloch of PML-Q won by 57,071 votes.

Election 2008 

General elections were held on 18 Feb 2008. Raheela Perveen of Pakistan Peoples Party Parliamentarian (PPPP) succeeded with 79,127 votes in the election and became the member of National Assembly.

Election 2013 

General elections were held on 11 May 2013. Rajab Ali Khan Baloch of PML-N won by 88,162 votes and became the  member of National Assembly.

Election 2018 
General elections were held on 25 July 2018.

See also
NA-97 Faisalabad-III
NA-99 Faisalabad-V

References

External links
 Election result's official website

NA-078